"Ashes by Now" is a song written by Rodney Crowell. It has since been recorded several by times by various musical artists in the country music format. The song was first recorded by Crowell himself, eventually releasing it as a single in 1980.

Rodney Crowell version 
Crowell originally recorded "Ashes by Now" in January 1978 in Los Angeles, California. The recording session featured musician Ricky Skaggs playing the fiddle, among other prominent session musicians of the period.

Before its release as a single, it served as the b-side to his 1978 single "Elvira." The song was later re-released in April 1980 as the A-side single via Warner Bros. Records becoming a minor chart hit on the Billboard Hot Country Singles and Hot 100 that year. The song was included on Crowell's 1980 studio album But What Will the Neighbors Think.

The song was covered by Crowell's fellow collaborator Emmylou Harris on her 1981 album Evangeline.

Chart performance

Emmylou Harris version 
Emmylou Harris covered "Ashes by Now" on the tenth and final track on her 1981 record, "Evangeline," which was released under Warner Records. Harris is a 12-time Grammy Award recipient and an iconic woman in Country and Folk music.

Lee Ann Womack version 

It was notably covered by Lee Ann Womack in 2000 and her version became the most commercially successful after also being issued as a single. Womack's rendition of the song was released in October 2000 as the second single from her third studio album, I Hope You Dance, and peaked at number 4 on the U.S. Billboard Hot Country Singles & Tracks chart, as well as number 45 on the U.S. Billboard Hot 100.

Critical reception 
Wade Jessen of Billboard wrote, "The Earnhardt tragedy may have played a role in a minor decline in plays of Womack's Ashes by Now." Editors at The Toronto Sun wrote, "A thorough makeover of the Rodney Crowell classic, from one of the exceedingly rare albums with the power to unite staunch old-timers and New Country types alike." Editors at Billboard wrote, "The inventive percussion that opens this terrific single is just the beginning of the magic that producer Mark Wright and Lee Ann Womack weave. One listen to this great single and it's obvious the song is sure to throw fuel on the fire."

Music video 
A music video directed by Gregg Horne was created for Lee Ann Womack's version of the song.

Chart performance
In the October 21, 2000 issue of Billboard, "Ashes by Now" debuted at number 49.

Year-end charts

Notes

References

1980 singles
2000 singles
Rodney Crowell songs
Lee Ann Womack songs
Songs written by Rodney Crowell
Warner Records singles
MCA Nashville Records singles
Song recordings produced by Mark Wright (record producer)
1980 songs